You can help build this list by migrating species from the List of Pelecaniformes by population to align it with the article Pelecaniformes.

Suliformes include the following families: Sulidae (gannets and boobies), Fregatidae (frigatebirds), Phalacrocoracidae (cormorants), Anhingidae (darters), and the Plotopteridae (flightless seabirds of the North Pacific that went extinct in the Miocene).

Lists of birds